Jalpura Tapa (Hindi: जलपुरा तापा) is a village and gram panchayat in Koilwar block, Bhojpur district in the Indian state of Bihar. Situated close to the Sone River, it is a large village with more than 12,000 residents.  Population-wise it is the largest village and area-wise, it is the 2nd-largest village of Koilwar block.

About
Twelve villages fall in the Tapa region on the banks of the Sone River in Bihar. This includes 9 villages of the Bhojpur district which are located on the west side of river and 3 villages of the Patna district which are located on the east side of the river.

The list of Tapa villages is as follows: Jalpura Tapa, Bhgwatpur, Bishunpur, Akhgaon, Nasratpur, Narainpur and Sarimpur Bachri in Bhojpur district; and Bindaul, Ghoratap and Bishunpura in Patna district.

Geography
Jalpura Tapa village is in Bhojpur district of Bihar and is situated near Akhgaon village on Sakaddi-Nasriganj highway (SH-81). It falls under the Chandi police station limits of Bhojpur Police. Jalpura Tapa village is 12 km from Arrah and around 42 km from state capital Patna.

It is located between Kulharia and Sandesh on SH-81 highway. Jalpura Tapa is adjacent to Akhgaon village, which is on the banks of the Sone River. In this region, Sone river flows from south to north, separating the Bhojpur district in the west and Patna district in the east side.

Demographics
The total population of village in 2011 Census was 12,168 out of which 6,432 were males while 5,736 were females. The Jalpura Tapa village has a higher Literacy rate than Bihar's average. In the 2011 Census, the literacy rate of the village was 64.40 % compared to 61.80 % of Bihar.

Transport

The Jalpura Tapa village is well connected by roads and highways to Patna, Arrah, Bihta, Koilwar, Sandesh and Sahar.

Highway
 Sakaddi–Sahar–Nasriganj (SH-81) 
 Patna–Arrah–Sasaram (NH-119A)

Railway
The nearest railway station is Kulharia railway station (KUA) which is east of Arrah Junction on the Patna-Mughalsarai section.

 Patna Junction (49 km)
 Arrah Junction (12 km)
 Bihta railway station (25 km)
 Kulharia railway station (9 km)

Airway
 Patna Airport (48 km)
 Bihta Airport (25 km)

Politics

The Jalpura Tapa village is a part of Sandesh assembly seat under the Arrah Lok Sabha. On 19 October 2015, Bharatiya Janata Party's then President Amit Shah had came here to attend a public rally.

Gram Panchayat
The Jalpura Tapa Gram panchayat is headed by a Sarpanch and comprises five villages: Jalpura Tapa, Rampur, Ratanpur, Mathiyapur and Salempur. All villages of the Bhojpur district fall under the Bhojpur Zila Panchayat.

Education
There are five schools run by the Government of Bihar in this village. Only two schools provide education to students till Matriculation (Class 10th).
 M.S. Jalpura Tapa (class 10)
 U.H.S. Jalpura Tapa (class 10)
 P.S. Jalpura Tapa (class 5)
 N.P.S. Mathiapur (class 5)
 N.P.S. Salempur West Tola

See also
 Arrah Lok Sabha constituency
 Koilwar

External links
 List of villages in Bhojpur district

References

Villages in Bhojpur district, India